Wulgrin II (also Vulgrin or Bougrin), called Taillefer or Rudel, was the Count of Angoulême from 1120 to his death on 16 November 1140. He was a son of Count William Taillefer III.

He married Pontia de la Marche, daughter of Roger the Poitevin and Almodis, the daughter of count Aldebert II of La Marche. They had only one son

William VI of Angoulême.

After the death of his first wife, Wulgrin remarried to Amable de Châtellerault and had three children:
Fulk
Geoffrey "Martel"
an unnamed daughter.

He retook Blaye from William X of Aquitaine in 1127 and reconstructed the castle there in 1140.

The troubadour Jaufré Rudel may be possibly his son or his son-in-law.

Ancestry

Sources

External links
Histoire P@ssion - Chronologie historique des Comtes d’Angoulême (in French)
L'art de Verifier des Faits historiquws, des Chartes, des Chroniques, et Autres Anciens Monuments, Depuis la Naissance de Notre-Seigner by Moreau et Yalade, 1818, Page 185
The coinage of the European continent, by Swan Sonnenschein, 1893,  Page 276
Annuaire Historique Pour L'annee 1854, by Société de l'histoire de France, Page 179
Nouvelle Encyclopedie Theologique, by acques-Paul Migne, 1854, Page 903

1080s births
1140 deaths
Counts of Angoulême
House of Taillefer
Year of birth unknown